The Bear Lodge Mountains are a small mountain range in Crook County, Wyoming. These mountains are protected in the Black Hills National Forest as part of its Bearlodge District. Devils Tower National Monument was the first U.S. National Monument and draws about 400,000 visitors per year to the area. The Bear Lodge Mountains are one of three mountain ranges which compose the Black Hills region and national forest, including the Black Hills itself and South Dakota's Elk Mountains.

Sundance, Wyoming, is the closest major city and lies south of the Bear Lodge Mountains. Wyoming Highway 24 (the Bear Lodge Highway) passes through the northern part of the range.

History

The place names Bear Lodge, Sun Dance, and Rock Gatherer (Inyan Kara) come from the history of Lakota people in this area. Devils Tower was declared a United States National Monument in 1906. From 1907 to 1908, the area was the Bear Lodge National Forest, then the Sundance National Forest through 1915, before becoming a district of the Black Hills National Forest.

Geography
The Bear Lodge Mountains were formed as a byproduct of the geological processes that created the Black Hills, and offer hikes throughout bottomlands, hills, and buttes. Unlike the Black Hills, this range is small and only a few igneous rocks are exposed. Just outside the range, however, lie the very large igneous intrusions of Devils Tower, Inyan Kara Mountain, and Sundance Mountain.

Bounded on the north by the Belle Fourche River, the mountains have several Belle Fourche River tributaries including Redwater, Blacktail, Miller, Beaver, Lytle, Lame Jones, and Hay Creeks. There were coal mines in these river valleys.

Habitat
While ponderosa pine and mixed-grass prairie grow on the highland of this range, its ravines offer habitat to species such as wild rose, skunkbush sumac, and chokecherry. At the foot of the mountains grow bur oak. Groves of aspen frequently separate meadows with fine soil from ponderosa pine forests growing in coarse soil. Vegetation in the Bear Lodge Mountains is similar to that of the Black Hills, although the Bear Lodge Mountains have no white spruce. The mountains' growing season is long, and forest growth in this range and the Black Hills is high. This productivity has led to high levels of logging.

References

Black Hills
Mountain ranges of Wyoming
Landforms of Crook County, Wyoming